Padel is a racket sport based on tennis originating from Mexico.

Padel may also refer to:

People
John Padel (1913–1999), British psychoanalyst and classicist
Oliver Padel, historian and Cornish Place-name scholar, son of John
Ruth Padel, British classical scholar, poet and journalist, daughter of John
Una Padel (1956–2006, British criminal justice reformer

Other
Padel, a village in the taluka Devgad, district of Sindhudurg, Maharashtra

See also
 Paddle (disambiguation)